State Route 146 (SR 146) is a short state route in the U.S. state of Maine. It is located entirely in the town of New Portland in Somerset County. It was first established in 1925 and the route has not changed since.

Junction list

References

External links

Floodgap Roadgap's RoadsAroundME: Maine State Route 146

146
Transportation in Somerset County, Maine